The New Zealand national cricket team toured South Africa during the 2000–01 season, playing six One Day Internationals (ODIs) and three Test matches, as well as five tour matches, between 18 October and 12 December 2000. South Africa won the ODI series 5–0 after the first match was rained off during play. They also won the Test series 2–0; the third match finished in a draw as play was not possible on three of the five scheduled days.

Squads

ODI series

1st ODI

2nd ODI

3rd ODI

4th ODI

5th ODI

6th ODI

Test series

1st Test

2nd Test

3rd Test

Tour matches

50-over: Gauteng v New Zealanders

Three-day: Boland v New Zealanders

Three-day: North West v New Zealanders

50-over: Border v New Zealanders

Three-day: Border v New Zealanders

References

External links
Tour home at ESPNcricinfo

2000 in New Zealand cricket
International cricket competitions in 2000–01
2000-01
2000–01 South African cricket season
2000 in South African cricket